K255 or K-255 may refer to:

K-255 (Kansas highway), a state highway in Kansas
HMS Ballinderry (K255), a former UK Royal Navy ship